Khushbu is an Indian actress who has predominantly worked in Tamil language films, in addition to Telugu, Malayalam, Kannada language films. She has appeared in more than 200 films and in that, over a 100+ movies are directly credited to Tamil only.

Film
As actress

Tamil

Telugu

Malayalam

Kannada

Hindi

Television
She is known for the TV game show Jackpot and the serials Kalki, Janani Kungumam, Nandini and Lakshmi Stores. Khushbu has also appeared as a judge on the reality shows, Maanada Mayilada, Azhagiya Thamizh Maghan and Junior Super Stars.

Serials

Shows

Other works

References

External links
 

Indian filmographies
Actress filmographies